John Dawson Winter III (February 23, 1944 – July 16, 2014) was an American singer and guitarist. Winter was known for his high-energy blues rock albums and live performances in the late 1960s and 1970s. He also produced three Grammy Award-winning albums for blues singer and guitarist Muddy Waters. After his time with Waters, Winter recorded several Grammy-nominated blues albums. In 1988, he was inducted into the Blues Foundation Hall of Fame and in 2003, he was ranked 63rd in Rolling Stone magazine's list of the "100 Greatest Guitarists of All Time".

Early life 
Johnny Winter was born in Beaumont, Texas, on February 23, 1944. He and his younger brother Edgar Winter (born 1946) were nurtured at an early age by their parents in musical pursuits.  Both were born with albinism.  Their father, Leland, Mississippi native John Dawson Winter Jr. (1909–2001), was also a musician who played saxophone and guitar and sang at churches, weddings, Kiwanis and Rotary Club gatherings. Johnny and his brother began performing at an early age. When Winter was ten years old, the brothers appeared on a local children's show with Johnny playing ukulele.

Career

Early career 
His recording career began at the age of 15, when his band Johnny and the Jammers released "School Day Blues" on a Houston record label. During this same period, he was able to see performances by classic blues artists such as Muddy Waters, B.B. King, and Bobby Bland. In the early days, Winter would sometimes sit in with Roy Head and the Traits when they performed in the Beaumont area, and in 1967, Winter recorded a single with the Traits: "Tramp" backed with "Parchman Farm" (Universal Records 30496). In 1968, he released his first album The Progressive Blues Experiment, on Austin's Sonobeat Records.

Signing with Columbia Records 

Winter got his biggest break in December 1968, when Mike Bloomfield, whom he met and jammed with in Chicago, invited him to sing and play a song during a Bloomfield and Al Kooper concert at the Fillmore East in New York City. As it happened, representatives of Columbia Records (which had released the Top Ten Bloomfield/Kooper/Stills Super Session album) were at the concert. Winter played and sang B.B. King's "It's My Own Fault" to loud applause, and within a few days, was signed to what was reportedly the largest advance in the history of the recording industry at that time—$600,000.

Winter's first Columbia album, Johnny Winter, was recorded and released in 1969. It featured the same backing musicians with whom he had recorded The Progressive Blues Experiment, bassist Tommy Shannon and drummer Uncle John Turner, plus Edgar Winter on keyboards and saxophone on 2 tracks, and (for his "Mean Mistreater") Willie Dixon on upright bass and Big Walter Horton on harmonica. The album featured a few selections that became Winter signature songs, including his composition "Dallas" (an acoustic blues, on which Winter played a steel-bodied, resonator guitar), John Lee "Sonny Boy" Williamson's "Good Morning Little School Girl", and B.B. King's "Be Careful with a Fool".

The album's success coincided with Imperial Records picking up The Progressive Blues Experiment for wider release. The same year, the Winter trio toured and performed at several rock festivals, including Woodstock. With brother Edgar added as a full member of the group, Winter also recorded his second album, Second Winter, in Nashville in 1969. The two-disc album only had three recorded sides (the fourth was blank). It introduced more staples of Winter's concerts, including Chuck Berry's "Johnny B. Goode" and Bob Dylan's "Highway 61 Revisited". Johnny entered into a short-lived affair with Janis Joplin, which culminated at a concert at New York's Madison Square Garden, where Johnny joined her on stage to sing and perform.

Unofficial albums 
Contrary to urban legend, Johnny Winter did not perform with Jimi Hendrix and Jim Morrison on the infamous 1968 Hendrix bootleg album Woke up this Morning and Found Myself Dead from New York City's the Scene club. According to Winter, "I never even met Jim Morrison! There's a whole album of Jimi and Jim and I'm supposedly on the album but I don't think I am 'cause I never met Jim Morrison in my life! I'm sure I never, never played with Jim Morrison at all! I don't know how that [rumor] got started."

Beginning in 1969, the first of numerous Johnny Winter albums was released which were cobbled together from approximately fifteen singles (about 30 "sides") he recorded before signing with Columbia in 1969. Many were produced by Roy Ames, owner of Home Cooking Records/Clarity Music Publishing, who had briefly managed Winter. According to an article from the Houston Press, Winter left town for the express purpose of getting away from him. Ames died on August 14, 2003, of natural causes at age 66. As Ames left no obvious heirs, the ownership rights of the Ames master recordings remain unclear. As Winter stated in an interview when the subject of Roy Ames came up, "This guy has screwed so many people it makes me mad to even talk about him."

Johnny Winter And 

In 1970, when his brother Edgar released a solo album Entrance and formed Edgar Winter's White Trash, an R&B/jazz-rock group, the original trio disbanded. Johnny Winter then formed a new band with the remnants of the McCoys—guitarist Rick Derringer, bassist Randy Jo Hobbs, and drummer Randy Z (who was Derringer's brother, their family name being Zehringer). Originally to be called "Johnny Winter and the McCoys", the name was shortened to "Johnny Winter And", which was also the name of their first album. The album included Derringer's "Rock and Roll, Hoochie Koo" and signaled a more rock-oriented direction for Winter. When Johnny Winter And began to tour, Randy Z was replaced with drummer Bobby Caldwell. Their mixture of the new rock songs with Winter's blues songs was captured on the live album Live Johnny Winter And. It included a new performance of "It's My Own Fault", the song which brought Winter to the attention of Columbia Records.

Winter's momentum was throttled when he sank into heroin addiction during the Johnny Winter And days. After he sought treatment for and recovered from the addiction, Winter was put in front of the music press by manager Steve Paul to discuss the addiction candidly. By 1973, he returned to the music scene with the release of Still Alive and Well, a basic blend of blues and hard rock, whose title track was written by Rick Derringer. His comeback concert at Long Island, New York's Nassau Coliseum featured the "And" line-up minus Rick Derringer and Bobby Caldwell. Also performing on stage was Johnny's wife Susie. Saints & Sinners and John Dawson Winter III, two albums released in 1974, continue in the same direction. In 1975, Johnny returned to Bogalusa, Louisiana, to produce an album for Thunderhead, a Southern rock band which included Pat Rush and Bobby "T" Torello, who would later play with Winter. A second live Winter album, Captured Live!, was released in 1976 and features an extended performance of "Highway 61 Revisited".

Muddy Waters sessions 
In live performances, Winter often told the story about how, as a child, he dreamed of playing with the blues guitarist Muddy Waters. He got his chance in 1974, when blues artists came together to honor Waters, the musician responsible for bringing blues to Chicago; the resulting concert presented many blues classics and was the start of a TV series, Soundstage (this particular session was called "Blues Summit in Chicago"). And in 1977, after Waters' long-time label Chess Records went out of business, Winter brought Waters into the studio to record Hard Again for Blue Sky Records, a label set up by Winter's manager and distributed by Columbia. In addition to producing the album, Winter played guitar with Waters veteran James Cotton on harmonica. Winter produced two more studio albums for Waters, I'm Ready (with Big Walter Horton on harmonica) and King Bee and a best-selling live album Muddy "Mississippi" Waters – Live. The partnership produced three Grammy Awards for Waters and an additional Grammy for Winter's own Nothin' But the Blues, with backing by members of Waters' band. Waters told Deep Blues author Robert Palmer that Winter had done remarkable work in reproducing the sound and atmosphere of Waters's vintage Chess Records recordings of the 1950s. AllMusic writer Mark Deming noted: "Between Hard Again and The Last Waltz [1976 concert film by The Band], Waters enjoyed a major career boost, and he found himself touring again for large and enthusiastic crowds".

Lawsuit against DC Comics 
In 1996, Winter and his brother Edgar filed suit against DC Comics and the creators of the Jonah Hex: Riders of the Worm and Such limited series, claiming, among other things, defamation: two characters named Johnny and Edgar Autumn in the series strongly resemble the Winters. The brothers claimed the comics falsely portrayed them as "vile, depraved, stupid, cowardly, subhuman individuals who engage in wanton acts of violence, murder and bestiality for pleasure and who should be killed." The California Supreme Court sided with DC Comics, holding that the comic books were deserving of First Amendment protection.

Later career

After his time with Blue Sky Records, Winter began recording for several labels, including Alligator, Point Blank, and Virgin, where he focused on blues-oriented material. In 2004, he received a Grammy Award nomination for his I'm a Bluesman album. Beginning in 2007, a series of live Winter albums titled the Live Bootleg Series and a live DVD all entered the Top 10 Billboard Blues chart. In 2009, The Woodstock Experience album was released, which includes eight songs that Winter performed at the 1969 festival. In 2011, Johnny Winter released Roots on Megaforce Records. It includes Winter's interpretation of eleven early blues and rock 'n' roll classics and features several guest artists (Vince Gill, Sonny Landreth, Susan Tedeschi, Edgar Winter, Warren Haynes, and Derek Trucks). His last studio album, Step Back (which features appearances by Joe Bonamassa, Eric Clapton, Billy Gibbons, Leslie West, Brian Setzer, Dr. John, Paul Nelson, Ben Harper and Joe Perry), was released on September 2, 2014. Nelson and Winter won a Grammy Award in the Best Blues Album category for Step Back in 2015. Nelson said Winter knew it was an award winner and Winter told him "If we don't win a Grammy for this, they're nuts."

Winter continued to perform live, including at festivals throughout North America and Europe. He headlined such prestigious events as the New Orleans Jazz & Heritage Festival, Chicago Blues Festival, the 2009 Sweden Rock Festival, the Warren Haynes Christmas Jam, and Rockpalast. He also performed with the Allman Brothers at the Beacon Theatre in New York City on the 40th anniversary of their debut. In 2007 and 2010, Winter performed at Eric Clapton's Crossroads Guitar Festivals. Two guitar instructional DVDs were produced by Cherry Lane Music and the Hal Leonard Corporation. The Gibson Guitar Company released the signature Johnny Winter Firebird guitar in a ceremony in Nashville with Slash presenting.

Teddy Slatus Management 
During the time Teddy Slatus was employed as Winter's manager (1984 to 2005) it has been alleged Slatus abused his power and continued to give Winter Methadone to stop him from asking about getting paid. Johnny could barely talk or play anymore until Paul Nelson took over Johnny's management in 2005, slowly easing him off drugs, alcohol, and smoking.

Personal life and death 
In 1993 Winter married Susan Warford.

Winter was professionally active until the time of his death near Zürich, Switzerland, on July 16, 2014. He was found dead in his hotel room two days after his last performance, at the Cahors Blues Festival in France. The cause of Winter's death was not officially released. According to his guitarist friend and record producer Paul Nelson, Winter died of emphysema combined with pneumonia.

Writing in Rolling Stone magazine, after Winter's death, David Marchese said, "Winter was one of the first blues rock guitar virtuosos, releasing a string of popular and fiery albums in the late Sixties and early Seventies, becoming an arena-level concert draw in the process" ... [he] "made an iconic life for himself by playing the blues".

Recognition and legacy
Winter produced three Grammy Award-winning albums by Muddy Waters – Hard Again (1977), I'm Ready (1978), and Muddy "Mississippi" Waters – Live (1979). Several of Winter's own albums were nominated for Grammy Awards – Guitar Slinger (1984) and Serious Business (1985) for Best Traditional Blues Album, and Let Me In (1991) and I'm a Bluesman (2004) for Best Contemporary Blues Album. In 2015 Winter posthumously won the Grammy Award for Best Blues Album for Step Back. The album also won the 2015 Blues Music Award for Best Rock Blues Album. At the 18th Maple Blues Awards in 2015, Winter was also posthumously awarded the B.B. King International Artist of The Year Award.

In 1980, Winter was on the cover of the first issue of Guitar World. In 1988, he was inducted into the Blues Hall of Fame, the first non-African-American performer to be inducted into the Hall.

Multiple guitarists have cited Winter as an influence, including Joe Perry, Frank Marino, Michael Schenker, Adrian Smith, and Alex Skolnick.

In her audiobook May You Live in Interesting Times: A Memoir (2021), comedian and founding Saturday Night Live cast member Laraine Newman recounts losing her virginity to Johnny Winter at the age of 17 in the late 1960s.

In 2008 Johnny Winter appeared (alongside brother Edgar) in the documentary film American Music: Off the Record directed by Benjamin Meade.

Guitars and picking style
Winter played a variety of guitars during his career, but he is probably best known for his use of Gibson Firebirds. He owned several, but favored a 1963 Firebird V model. Winter explained:

The original Firebird was a departure from Gibson's traditional configuration, with Firebird "sidewinder" pickups in place of the company's standard sized PAF humbucker or P-90 single-coil pickup models. Later Firebirds used a different (non-sidewinder) design, which may account for Winter's preference for the 1963. Firebird pickups were still different than Gibson's Mini-Humbuckers, but the terminology is often incorrectly mixed. Firebird pickups, by nature of their design, are brighter than Mini-Humbuckers. In a 2014 interview, Winter described the tone:

In 2008, the Gibson Custom Shop issued a signature Johnny Winter Firebird V in a ceremony in Nashville with Slash presenting.

In 1984, luthier Mark Erlewine approached Winter with his Lazer electric guitar. With its unusual design (for the time) without a headstock and having a small body, Winter responded immediately: "the first day I plugged it in, it sounded so good that I wanted to use it for a gig that night." He commented:

Other guitars that Winter owned and played include a Gibson ES-125 (his first electric guitar), a Fender Stratocaster, a Gibson Les Paul/SG Custom, a Fender Mustang, a Gibson Les Paul Goldtop with P-90 pickups, a Gibson Flying V, an Epiphone Wilshire, a Gibson Black Beauty, a Fender Electric XII (strung with only 6 strings), and an acoustic National Resonator.

Winter played with a thumb pick and his fingers. His picking style was inspired by Chet Atkins and Merle Travis and he never used a flat pick. Winter preferred a plastic thumb pick sold by Gibson and a steel pinky slide, later marketed by Dunlop.

Discography

Studio albums

The Progressive Blues Experiment (Sonobeat 1968, re-released by UA/Imperial 1969)
Johnny Winter (Columbia 1969)
Second Winter (Columbia 1969)
Johnny Winter And (Columbia 1970)
Still Alive and Well (Columbia 1973)
Saints & Sinners (Columbia 1974)
John Dawson Winter III (Columbia 1974)
Nothin' but the Blues (Blue Sky 1977)
White, Hot and Blue (Blue Sky 1978)
Raisin' Cain (Blue Sky 1980)
Guitar Slinger (Alligator 1984)
Serious Business (Alligator 1985)
Third Degree (Alligator 1986)
The Winter of '88 (MCA/Voyager 1988)
Let Me In (Point Blank 1991)
Hey, Where's Your Brother? (Point Blank 1992)
I'm a Bluesman (Virgin 2004)
Roots (Megaforce 2011)
Step Back (Megaforce 2014)

Live albums

 Live Johnny Winter And (Columbia 1971)
 Captured Live! (Blue Sky 1976)
 Together (Blue Sky 1976) – with Edgar Winter
 Live in NYC '97 (Virgin 1998)
 The Woodstock Experience (Sony/Legacy 2009)
 Live at the Fillmore East 10/3/70 (Collectors' Choice 2010)

References

External links

1944 births
2014 deaths
20th-century American guitarists
20th-century American male musicians
Alligator Records artists
American blues guitarists
Country blues musicians
American blues harmonica players
American blues mandolinists
American blues singer-songwriters
American male guitarists
American rock guitarists
Blues rock musicians
Blue Sky Records artists
Columbia Records artists
Electric blues musicians
Grammy Award winners
Guitarists from Texas
Lead guitarists
People from Beaumont, Texas
People with albinism
Relix Records artists
Rock and roll musicians
Slide guitarists
Singer-songwriters from Texas
Texas blues musicians
American male singer-songwriters
Deaths from emphysema
Deaths from pneumonia in Switzerland